CKRC-FM is a radio station in Weyburn, Saskatchewan, Canada that operates at 103.5 FM. CKRC broadcasts a hot adult contemporary format branded as Magic 103.

Owned by Golden West Broadcasting, it shares studios with CFSL and CHWY-FM at 305 Souris Avenue in downtown Weyburn. CKRC first signed on at 7:00 AM, September 19, 2006. The station's original format was classic hits, but later flipped to hot AC.

External links

 
English-language FM radio station in Weyburn - Broadcasting Decision CRTC 2006-169 - April 24, 2006.

Krc
Krc
Krc
Weyburn
Radio stations established in 2006
2006 establishments in Saskatchewan